The Hospital of St John and St Elizabeth in St John's Wood, London, England, is a Catholic charitable general hospital in north London.

History and operations
The hospital was founded in 1856 with a Roman Catholic affiliation and is a registered charity. It was founded as the "Hospital of St Elizabeth" by the Duke of Norfolk. Originally located in Great Ormond Street, London, by the end of the 19th century it had relocated to St John's Wood and adopted its present name. The chapel which once stood on Great Ormond Street was moved brick-by-brick to its new site at the Hospital in St John's Wood.
 
At its founding, the hospital was entrusted to the care of the Sisters of Mercy, whose stewardship would continue for many decades to come; more recently, however, the Sisters of Mercy have withdrawn from the management of the hospital, and it is now under lay control. The hospital closed temporarily in 1866 due to a lack of funds, but later reopened. The hospital was vital during the war effort of both the First and Second World Wars, being used by the War Office to treat injured military personnel.
 
In 2009, it had an income of £42,671,000, making it one of the 150 largest charities in the United Kingdom.
 
The hospital came to media attention in late 2007 when two board members resigned in protest after a new code of ethics, issued by Cardinal Cormac Murphy-O'Connor, was accepted by the board. The new code "bars doctors from offering any service which conflicts with Catholic teaching" including "sex-change operations, providing contraception, abortion referrals and IVF treatment". Later in 2008, the Cardinal ordered the resignation of the remaining board members and installed Lord Guthrie of Craigiebank as chairman. It was reported that Jacob Rees-Mogg had resigned but Aida Hersham did not.

Facilities 
The hospital's facilities include five theatres, and en-suite bathrooms in all of the patients' rooms. It is also the home to British Athletics, which established its medical headquarters at the Hospital to care for track and field athletes. The hospital employs over 600 doctors.
 
St Andrew's Ward, a new £2.1 million 10-bed stroke and medical ward, opened in July 2016, bringing the total number of beds to over 70.

St John's Hospice
 
The hospital's profits from private healthcare are used to run St John's Hospice, a hospice located within the hospital site where over 4,500 terminally ill patients are treated each year.

See also
List of hospitals in England

References

External links
 
 

1856 establishments in England
Grade II* listed churches in the City of Westminster
Charities based in London
Health in the City of Westminster
Hospitals established in 1856
Hospitals in London
Catholic Church in England
Private hospitals in the United Kingdom
St John's Wood